"Cruel" is a song written and performed by Tori Amos. It was released as the third single from her 1998 album From the Choirgirl Hotel. In the United States it was released as a double A-side single with "Raspberry Swirl", off the same album.

Track listings
"Cruel" was released in the United States and Canada as a double A-side with "Raspberry Swirl".

US and Canada CD single
 "Cruel" (Shady Feline Mix) – 3:51
 "Raspberry Swirl (Lip Gloss Version) – 3:41
 "Ambient Raspberry Swirl" (Scarlet Spectrum Feels) – 8:10
 "Mainline Cherry" (Ambient Spark) – 5:11

US 7" vinyl single (Atlantic 7-84412)
 "Raspberry Swirl" (Lip Gloss Version) – 3:39
 "Cruel" (Shady Feline Mix) – 3:49

Charts

References

Tori Amos songs
1998 singles
Songs written by Tori Amos
Atlantic Records singles
1998 songs